Mohan Kishore Namadas was an Indian revolutionary and independence fighter in the 1930s.

Revolutionary activities
He was an active member of Anushilan Samiti of Kolkata.  He was sentenced to seven years imprisonment due to membership of Netrokona Soarikanda Political action case and deported to Cellular Jail in Andaman Islands.  He took part in the hunger strike of 1933 to protest against the inhuman treatment meted to the prisoners along with Mohit Moitra (convicted in Arms Act Case), Mahavir Singh (convicted in Second Lahore Conspiracy Case) and 30 others.  He died on 26 May 1933 due to the brutal force feeding process.  Mohit Moitra and Mahavir Singh also died during the Hunger Strike.

References 

Indian revolutionaries
Revolutionary movement for Indian independence
Prisoners and detainees of British India
Force-feeding
1933 deaths
Indian people who died in prison custody